St. Paul's High School may refer to:

India
St. Paul's High School, Belgaum
St. Paul's High School, Dadar, Mumbai
St. Paul's High School, Hajipur
St. Paul's High School, Hyderabad
St. Paul's High School, Veliyanad

Other countries
St. Paul's High School (Winnipeg), Manitoba, Canada
St. Paul's High School, Rangoon, Myanmar
St Paul's High School, Dunedin, New Zealand
St Paul's High School, Bessbrook, Northern Ireland
St Paul's English High School, Karachi, Pakistan
St Paul's High School, Glasgow, Scotland
St. Paul's High School, Musami, Zimbabwe

See also
St. Paul High School (disambiguation)
St. Paul's School (disambiguation)
Saint Paul (disambiguation)